Where There's a Will is a 1955 British comedy film directed by Vernon Sewell and starring Kathleen Harrison, George Cole and Leslie Dwyer. A family from east London take over a farm in the Devon countryside. The screenplay was written by R. F. Delderfield who adapted one of his own plays.

Synopsis
When their uncle dies without leaving a will, his farm passes to his nephew and two nieces, disappointing his housekeeper, Annie Yeo. While the nieces wish to sell the place, the nephew, Alfie Brewer, has ideas of setting up as a farmer. Facing the hostility of his family, and some of the locals, he attempts to improve the farm before its mortgage is called in.

Cast

Critical reception
TV Guide called it a "harmless comedy with some charming touches."

References

External links
 

1955 films
1955 comedy films
British comedy films
Films directed by Vernon Sewell
Films set in Devon
Films set in England
British films based on plays
1950s English-language films
1950s British films
British black-and-white films